Muzayrib (also spelled Mzerib, Mzeireb, Mzereeb, Mezereeb or al-Mezereeb) is a town in southern Syria, administratively part of the Daraa Governorate, located northwest of Daraa on the Jordan–Syria border. Nearby localities include al-Shaykh Saad and Nawa to the north, Da'el, Tafas and al-Shaykh Maskin to the northeast, and al-Yadudah to the southeast. According to the Syria Central Bureau of Statistics, Muzayrib had a population of 12,640 in the 2004 census. The town is also the administrative center of the Muzayrib nahiyah (subdistrict) consisting of nine villages with a combined population of 72,625. Muzayrib also has a community of Palestinian refugees.

History
Under the Ottomans, the town, well known for its springs and bazaars, served as the first major resting place along the Hajj caravan route from Damascus to Mecca. Along with al-Shaykh Saad, Muzayrib served as the main administrative center for the region of Hauran. In the 16th century, a fort was built in the town on the orders of Ottoman Sultan, Selim I. Its builder was a certain Hatim Tay. The fort had a bent gateway, unlike other Hajj forts which had straight entrances, and was built from locally quarried basaltic rock. Strategically located in the hinterland of Damascus, the fort at Muzayrib was the most solid demonstration of Ottoman power over Damascus, which experienced several revolts, including by the inhabitants or the local Jannissary corps. Thus, the provincial leadership of Damascus stringently controlled Muzayrib. Because of its important role in the Hajj route, large quantities of dry cakes were stored in the fort to provide for pilgrims who were dependent on the cakes for sustenance during their traversal of the desert or to supply the inhabitants of Damascus in case of a shortage. The fort also served as a place where the Damascus authorities collected taxes from pilgrims and where the amir al-hajj (Hajj caravan commander) distributed money to Bedouin tribal chiefs to dissuade them from attacking the Hajj pilgrims.

Instead of local Janissaries, imperial troops were stationed at the fort of Muzayrib. By 1672, the fort had an 80-man imperial garrison, a 300-man force of irregulars commanded by a local military official.  It was also the residence of the qadi (head judge) of Hauran. At the time, the fort contained a mosque, small bathhouse and storage rooms containing government and merchant goods. Between 1517 and 1757, the Hajj caravan at Muzayrib was attacked five times by Bedouins. In 1770, the rebel Egyptian army of Ali Bey led by Ismail Bey and an allied force led by Zahir al-Umar, the Arab strongman of the Galilee, stopped at Muzayrib on their way to capture Damascus. When they reached Muzayrib to face off with Governor Uthman Pasha, Ismail Bey decided to retreat because the encounter coincided with the arrival of the Hajj caravan in the town. Zahir unsuccessfully protested the move and the rebel armies withdrew.

In the 19th century, the fort at Muzayrib contained large warehouses, minor dwellings and a small mosque. A spring located to the northeast emptied into a pond containing abundant fish. Ruins were situated along the western banks of the spring. Hajj pilgrims who came to Muzayrib, which was still the main resting place of the caravan route, remained in the town for several days, and during each Hajj a large open market was held. An observer remarked at the end of the century that the place would have been blossoming, had it not been for its marshy and fever-producing surroundings.

The city was connected to the Ottoman telegraph network based in Damascus by 1875. In the late 1880s, the fortress was in a decaying state. The railway, owing to its construction along an undeveloped trade route, was a financial failure. However, it helped to open up Lebanon and develop the agricultural industry in the fertile volcanic plains of the Golan and the Hauran, making them the leading producers of wheat crops in the Middle East. By 1898, the fort at Muzayrib was largely ruined and within ten years, about two-thirds of its masonry had been reused by the local inhabitants for modern buildings in Muzayrib and villages in the vicinity.

References

Bibliography

 

''

External links
Google map
Cheik Meskin-map; 21L

Populated places in Daraa District
Towns in Syria